Kupino is a former military air base in Novosibirsk Oblast, Russia.  It is located 4 km southeast of the town of the same name. It largely served the interceptor air defense role for the Soviet Air Force.

Kupino was initially observed in the late 1950s by Western Lockheed U-2 overflights and was originally a training airfield. The 849th Fighter Aviation Regiment PVO was based there from 1962.  A 1966 satellite mission identified 30 Sukhoi Su-9 (NATO: Fishpot), confirming its role as an interceptor base, as well as first-generation interceptors that included 16 Mikoyan-Gurevich MiG-15 (NATO: Fagot) and 9 Yakovlev Yak-25 (NATO: Flashlight).  An air warning radar facility was identified 1 mile northwest of the runway.

The regiment continued to operate the Su-9 into the 1970s.  The regiment replaced it in 1980 with the MiG-23P (NATO: Flogger-G).

The base was closed after the end of the Cold War and the aviation regiment was disbanded in 1998.

References

Citations

Bibliography 

 

Russian Air Force bases
Soviet Air Force bases
Soviet Air Defence Force bases